The 2022 Tower Hamlets London Borough Council election took place on 5 May 2022. All 45 members of Tower Hamlets London Borough Council were elected. The elections took place alongside local elections in the other London boroughs and elections to local authorities across the United Kingdom.

In the previous election in 2018, the Labour Party regained control of the Council from no overall control, winning 42 out of the 45 seats with the Conservative Party as the principal opposition with two of the remaining three seats. The election coincided with an election for the mayor of Tower Hamlets. In the 2022 elections, the Aspire Party gained control of the Council from Labour, winning 24 seats, and also won the mayoralty. Reduced to 19 seats, this is the lowest ever number of seats Labour have ever held in the history of Tower Hamlets; the Conservatives retained one seat, while the Green Party gained one seat.

Background

History 

The thirty-two London boroughs were established in 1965 by the London Government Act 1963. They are the principal authorities in Greater London and have responsibilities including education, housing, planning, highways, social services, libraries, recreation, waste, environmental health and revenue collection. Some powers are shared with the Greater London Authority, which also manages passenger transport, police, and fire.

Since its formation, Tower Hamlets has generally been under Labour control. The SDP–Liberal Alliance won a majority of seats in the 1986 election, and the newly formed Liberal Democrats won a majority in the 1990 election. There was also a period of no overall control from 2014 to 2018. From 1990 to 2006, all councillors elected to the council were Labour or Liberal Democrats. In the 2006 election, Labour maintained its majority by winning 26 seats, but the new Respect Party won twelve seats, with the Conservatives on seven and the Liberal Democrats on six. In the 2010 election, Respect lost all but one of its seats with Labour winning 41, the Conservatives winning eight and the Liberal Democrats winning one. Respect were the only party to advocate a change in executive arrangements at the council to introduce a directly elected mayor of Tower Hamlets. A mayoral petition was successfully arranged by the Respect activist Abjol Miah, which was successful.

The Labour councillor Lutfur Rahman, who had been leader of the council from 2008 until his was replaced in 2010 after a Channel 4 documentary linked him to the Islamic Forum of Europe, was selected as his party's candidate for the mayoralty. He was removed as the candidate by the National Executive Committee of the Labour Party after "very serious allegations" about the selection. He subsequently ran as an independent candidate with support from Respect. Rahman was elected in the October 2010 election with more than half of the vote in the first round. Rahman established a new political party called Tower Hamlets First in 2013. He ran for re-election as the Tower Hamlets First candidate in 2014, being re-elected in the second round against the Labour candidate John Biggs. In the concurrent council election, Tower Hamlets First won 18 seats, with Labour on 22 and the Conservatives on 5, resulting in no overall control of the council.

In 2015, Rahman was removed from office and his election was declared void after he was found guilty of electoral fraud. He was barred from seeking re-election for five years. Tower Hamlets First was de-registered as a political party by the Electoral Commission shortly after. In the 2015 re-run of the mayoral election, Rahman endorsed the independent candidate Rabina Khan. Khan had been elected as a Labour councillor in 2010 but had been suspended for supporting Rahman's initial 2010 election, and had been re-elected in the 2014 council election as a Tower Hamlets First councillor. Biggs won the election. The former Tower Hamlets First councillors formed the Tower Hamlets Independent Group. Khan formed the breakaway group the People's Alliance of Tower Hamlets (PATH) with some other Tower Hamlets Independent Group councillors, which was formally registered in 2018. The remaining Tower Hamlets Independent Group councillors formed the new party Aspire.

In the most recent mayoral election in 2018, Khan stood as the PATH candidate, coming second, and Ohid Ahmed stood for Aspire. Ahmed had been endorsed by Rahman. Biggs was successfully re-elected for the Labour Party with 48.4% of the vote in the first round and 72.7% of the vote after second preferences were taken into account. In the concurrent council election, Labour won 42 seats with 46.1% of the vote, while the Conservatives won two seats with 9.9% of the vote across the borough. Khan was elected as a councillor for PATH, with her party winning 11.3% of the vote across the borough. Aspire lost all their representation, winning no seats with 15.4% of the vote. The Liberal Democrats received 8.6% of the vote and the Green Party received 7.9% of the vote, but neither won any seats.

Council term 
Rabina Khan disbanded PATH in August 2018 and switched to the Liberal Democrats. Mohammed Pappu, a councillor for Blackwall and Cubitt town, was suspended from the Labour Party in October 2018 after sharing antisemitic posts on social media. In the following month, he apologised, saying that he had not read the posts properly and offered to undergo training. A Labour councillor for Lansbury ward, Mohammad Harun, resigned in December 2018 after Biggs ordered an investigation into allegations of housing fraud. A Labour councillor for Shadwell ward, Ruhul Amin, resigned in January 2019 because he was moving to Bangladesh. Both by-elections took place in February 2019, with Rajib Ahmed holding Lansbury for Labour and Ohid Ahmed coming in second place for Aspire. The Aspire candidate Mohammad Harun Miah won the by-election in Shadwell, with the Labour candidate Asik Rahman coming in second place. Asik Rahman had apologised during the campaign for liking the Facebook page of Zakir Naik, a preacher who was banned from entering the UK.

The leader of the Conservatives on the council, Andrew Wood, resigned from his party to sit as an independent in February 2020 while remaining in the Conservative group on the council. He cited the Conservative government's approach to Brexit and decision to override guidance to approve a controversial housing development in the borough. John Pierce, a Labour councillor for Weavers ward, died in June 2021. He had been first elected in 2012. A by-election to fill the seat was held in August 2021, which was won by the Aspire candidate Kabir Ahmed. A Conservative councillor credited Aspire's victory to the Labour council's implementation of low traffic neighbourhood schemes, which Ahmed promised to end if Aspire won the 2022 council elections.

Mayoral referendum 

Tower Hamlets held a referendum in May 2021 on whether to maintain the system of directly electing a mayor, or to return to the leader-and-cabinet model where councillors elect a leader. Biggs and the Labour Party, the Conservatives, the Liberal Democrats including Rabina Khan, and the Green Party campaigned in favour of ending the mayoral system, while Rahman campaigned to keep it. The outcome of the referendum was to continue with the mayoral system, with 77.8% of votes in favour.

Campaign

Council election 
The communities minister Kemi Badenoch wrote to the Metropolitan Police and Electoral Commission about concerns over the possibility of election fraud and family voting in Tower Hamlets.

Council candidates 
The Labour Party, Conservative Party and Liberal Democrats all fielded a full slate of 45 candidates each. Aspire put forward 44 candidates - missing one candidate in the Whitechapel ward where Shahed Ali stood for the "Resurrection Young People. In Sha Allah" party.  The Green Party fielded 39 candidates, with both the SDP and TUSC standing one candidate each.

The election also saw the first openly transgender candidate stand in Tower Hamlets with Rebecca Jones of the Liberal Democrats in Bethnal Green West.

Mayoral election 
The Labour mayor of Tower Hamlets, John Biggs sought re-election. In January 2022, the Liberal Democrat councillor Rabina Khan was announced as her party's candidate for the mayoralty. In the same month, the independent councillor Andrew Wood, who had resigned from the Conservative group in 2020, announced he would stand for election as both a councillor and mayor. Wood said the council should spend more of its reserves building homes, schools and bridges. The former mayor of the borough, Lutfur Rahman, announced his candidacy for the Aspire party in February 2022. Rahman's five-year ban from standing for election, having been found guilty by an election court of "corrupt and illegal practices", had elapsed. He was endorsed at his formal campaign launch in March by the former mayor of London Ken Livingstone and the peer Pola Uddin. Elliott Weaver  stood as the Conservative mayoral candidate.

Electoral process 

Tower Hamlets, like other London borough councils, elects all of its councillors at once every four years. The previous election took place in 2018. The election will take place by multi-member first-past-the-post voting, with each ward being represented by two or three councillors. Electors will have as many votes as there are councillors to be elected in their ward, with the top two or three being elected.

All registered electors (British, Irish, Commonwealth and European Union citizens) living in London aged 18 or over will be entitled to vote in the election. People who live at two addresses in different councils, such as university students with different term-time and holiday addresses, are entitled to be registered for and vote in elections in both local authorities. Voting in-person at polling stations will take place from 7:00 to 22:00 on election day, and voters will be able to apply for postal votes or proxy votes in advance of the election.

Council composition

Results summary

Results by Ward
Asterisks denote incumbent Councillors seeking re-election. Unless otherwise noted, the councillors seeking re-election were elected in 2018.

Bethnal Green East (formerly Bethnal Green)

Bethnal Green West (formerly St Peters)

Blackwall and Cubitt Town

Bow East

Bow West

Bromley North

Bromley South

Canary Wharf 

† Andrew Wood was elected for the Conservative Party in 2018, but resigned to sit as an Independent in 2020.

Island Gardens

Lansbury

Limehouse

Mile End

Poplar

Shadwell 

† Rabina Khan was elected for PATH in 2018, but defected to the Liberal Democrats.

Spitalfields and Banglatown

St Dunstan's

St Katherine's and Wapping

Stepney Green

Weavers

Whitechapel

Candidate winning margin 

Eight candidates won election by fewer that 100 votes - although one of these was over a candidate from the same party.

References 

Council elections in the London Borough of Tower Hamlets
Tower Hamlets